Royal Centre in Halifax, Nova Scotia, Canada, is a 13-storey office tower in the heart of Halifax's financial district.

Description 
The Royal Centre was built in 1960 and was the regional head office of the Royal Bank of Canada (until it moved to the RBC Waterside Centre in 2014), located on 5161 George Street between Granville and Hollis Streets across from the Provincial Legislature Building.

This building does not violate the bylaw banning the construction of any building visible from inside Citadel Hill (Fort George).

See also 
 Halifax Regional Municipality
 Downtown Halifax
 Halifax

References 

Buildings and structures in Halifax, Nova Scotia

Office buildings completed in 1960